The Hamburg Parliament (literally “Hamburgish Citizenry”) is the unicameral legislature of the German state of Hamburg according to the constitution of Hamburg. As of 2011 there were 121 members in the parliament, representing a relatively equal amount of constituencies. The parliament is situated in the city hall Hamburg Rathaus and is part of the Government of Hamburg.

The parliament is among other things responsible for the law, the election of the Erster Bürgermeister (First Mayor) for the election period and the control of the Senate (cabinet).

The President of the Hamburg Parliament is the highest official person of the Free and Hanseatic City of Hamburg.

The 121 members are elected in universal, direct, free, equal and secret elections every five years.

History

Origins 
Bürgerschaft (literally citizenry) is a term in use since the Middle Ages to refer to the male inhabitants of Hamburg with citizenship. A committee of the landowning class within the city, called Erbgesessene Bürgerschaft (literally about citizenry seated on heritable plots), was formed out of this group in the 15th century to consult with the city's ruling councillors (Ratsherren; later called following the Roman example the Senate of Hamburg and senators), and to be consulted by them.

The city council, in early times supposedly elected by male citizens, had turned into an autocratic body restaffing its vacancies by coöptation. The system of coöptating seats was prone to corruption and it came to several major struggles in the following decades. The first relevant document organising power and tasks of citizenry and the city council (government), which was traditionally dominated by the local merchants, dates back to 1410 and is named Erster Rezess (roughly: The first Settlement, literally the agreement reached before parting [Lat. recedere] of the negotiating partners).

The Erster Rezess came about after the city council (Senate, no parliament but the government) had cited and arrested , a burgher of Hamburg. Brandes had claims due against John IV, Duke of Saxe-Lauenburg from a credit which Brandes had granted earlier. Brandes had taken the defaulting duke, during his visit in Hamburg in 1410, to task and dunned him in a way the duke considered insulting. The duke complained to the senate, which then interrogated Brandes. He admitted the dunning, and thus the senate arrested him. This caused a civic uproar of Hamburgers.

"In Hamburg as in other cities, the parishes ... had been not only church districts but also municipal political districts since the Middle Ages. They ... formed four incorporated bodies (Petri, Nikolai, Katharinen, Jacobi) in which the "allodial" (property-owning) burghers and the heads of guilds – thus only a fraction of the male population – were entitled to vote." The enfranchised citizens, grouped along their parishes, then elected from each of the then four parishes 12 representatives (deacons), the Council of the Forty-Eighters (die Achtundvierziger), who on Saint Lawrence Day (August 10) stipulated with the senate the Recess of 1410 (later called Erster Rezess).

The Erster Rezess is now considered Hamburg's oldest constitutional act, establishing first principles balancing the power of the government of the city-state and its citizens. The Erster Rezess established the principle that in Hamburg nobody may be arrested at the government's will but only after a prior judicial hearing and conviction (except of in flagrante delicto). Furthermore, the Erster Rezess stipulated that the council (senate) has to synchronise with the citizens in all severe matters, such as war, contracts with foreign powers, or decisions as to levying new or raising higher taxes, by convoking the citizens in plenary assembly. The plenary assemblies met in front of the city hall. With an overall population of roughly 10,000 people and only a minority among the male adults enjoying citizenship, the plenary assemblies of the citizenry (the Bürgerschaft) formed a functioning body, though with restricted authority.

The Forty-Eighters persisted, serving as opinion-forming committee within the citizenry, and developed into the first permanent representation of the citizens of Hamburg. Further settlements (Rezesse) between senate and Bürgerschaft constituted the more formalised coöperation between them. "The Reformation brought with it a significant curtailment of the senate's governmental power." In Hamburg the Reformation started in 1524 and was adopted by the Senate in 1529, fixed by the Langer Rezess (roughly: Long Settlement, negotiated for more than a year). The Langer Rezess made the ruling council (senate) accountable to several civic committees, forming together the Erbgesessene Bürgerschaft.

"At about the same time, three deacons from each parish (twelve altogether), acting as "chief elders", took on the task of centralizing, administering, and uniformly distributing relief to the poor." The  were also entitled to decide with the senate in all matters concerning the welfare and the concord of the city, and formed thus besides Bürgerschaft and senate the third constitutive body, however, excluded from government again by the new constitution of 1859. The Forty-Eighters, now called Kollegium der Diakone (collegial panel of the deacons) continued to exist and the plenary assembly of citizens was replaced by the Assembly of the 144 (Hundertvierundvierziger, or formally: Kollegium der Diakone und Subdiakone), comprising 36 representatives (12 deacons and 24 subdeacons) from each parish.

Later the parishioners of St. Michael's Church in the New Town, established as parish independent of St. Nicholas in 1647, were granted the same rights as the burghers in one of the four parishes in the Old Town, and the same number of representatives. "Beginning in 1685, there were thus fifteen chief elders: sixty deacons instead of forty-eight and 180 assembly members altogether, rather than 144. These structures existed into the nineteenth century, with each college recruiting new members from the next larger." This assembly of 180 (as of 1685) was more and more identified as the Erbgesessene Bürgerschaft, although the council of the Sixty (extended from the Forty-Eighters) was a panel previously subsumed as part of it.

Since Lutheran parishes and the collegial bodies staffed with their parishioners formed the constitutional bodies of Hamburg there was no easy way to open politics for non-Lutherans. Bürgerschaft, chief elders and senate could not settle all aspects of the sensitive balance of power. Thus, a commission, sent by the emperor of the Holy Roman Empire, had to secure the peace by force in 1708 and the city was once more negotiating and reforming her own administrative structures in the following years.

The Vormärz led to even more criticism of the established structures and Hamburg participated in the elections of the Frankfurt Parliament in 1848. This resulted in even more debates and the Erbgesessene Bürgerschaft passed a new electoral law to meet the criticism in September 1848 but the restoration, supported and enforced by Prussian troops during the First Schleswig War, turned the table.

Elections of 1859 
A new attempt to reform the constitution was launched after long discussions in 1859 and the Erbgesessene Bürgerschaft met for the last time in November of this year to establish a new order as well as to disband itself in favour of the Bürgerschaft. Since 1859 Bürgerschaft refers to this elected parliamentary body.

Hamburg parliament in the Federal Republic 
The elections of 1949 led to the second elected parliament of Hamburg after the Second World War and the Social Democratic Party of Germany maintained her traditional dominant role, already re-established under the British-controlled elections of 1946.  The party continued to govern the city, except 1953-57, until the first von Beust-Senate, formed in 2001.

Since March 23, 2011 the Hamburg Parliament has been in its 20th legislative period in the Federal Republic of Germany. A SPD-Government succeeded a coalition of CDU and the Greens.

Organisation

President and board

The president of the parliament presides over the parliament and its sessions. The president is supported by a 'First Vice-president' and 3 vice presidents, all are elected by the representatives. President, vice presidents, and 3 recording clerks are the board (German: Präsidium).

As of 2011, the president of the Hamburg Parliament was Carola Veit.

Council of Elders
The Council of Elders (German: Ältestenrat) consists of the president, the vice presidents and several members, appointed by the parliamentary groups. The council support the president and the board regarding decisions of the agenda, personnel matters, and financial affairs.

Parliamentary groups
Parliamentary groups (German: Fraktionen) are pooled by minimum 6 members of the parliament. Most these groups are by one party.

Committees
The daily work of the parliament is done in committees.

Candidates' qualifications

The qualification is regulated by law. As of 2008, candidate must be at least 18 years old, and must not be allowed to vote by a verdict, is patient of a psychiatric ward under law, or has a representative under law.

Current composition

References

External links

Official website of the Parliament of Hamburg
Parliament of Hamburg on www.hamburg.de